Bogdan Mihăilescu (6 March 1942 – December 2014) was a Romanian water polo player. He competed in the men's tournament at the 1972 Summer Olympics.

References

External links
 

1942 births
2014 deaths
Romanian male water polo players
Olympic water polo players of Romania
Water polo players at the 1972 Summer Olympics
Water polo players from Bucharest